4,077-acre Long Lake is a  lake in the town of Long Lake in Hamilton County, New York in the United States; the average width is half a mile.  It is part of the Raquette River, which flows in a straight, northeast-trending valley. NY 30 crosses at a narrows  from the south end where the hamlet of Long Lake is located.  There are two public beaches and a state boat launch.  More than half of the shoreline is part of the New York State Forest preserve. 
The northern end of the lake is undeveloped. The lake is also part of the 740-mile Northern Forest Canoe Trail, which begins in Old Forge, NY and ends in Fort Kent, ME. The Long Lake Camp for the Arts is based on the west side of the lake.

History
Settled by the 1830s, Long Lake was isolated, except by water, until the New York Central Railroad extended a spur to Sabbatis at the north town line. The area was frequented by sportsmen and tourists, and the earliest settlers were hunting guides and boat builders. Long Lake was part of a water route that connected the Fulton Chain Lakes with the Saint Lawrence River drainage.  This route was frequently traveled by guideboat or canoe in the mid-late 19th century.  At that time, "a typical trip might start at the Saranacs, from which a party could make its way to the Raquette River via Indian Carry and Stoney Creek."  The trip continued "via the lakes accessible from it— Long, Raquette, Forked, Blue and Tupper."

U.S. Senator Orville H. Platt had a summer camp on Long Lake in the 19th century.

In 1925 Ephraim Sklyansky, CEO of Amtorg Trading Corporation (an unofficial representative office of the USSR in the US) and Leon Trotsky's right hand, died on Long Lake in a boating accident with his colleague Isai Khurgin, the previous director of Amtorg. The accident was suspected to be a murder organized by GPU.

There was once a proposal to link Long Lake with the Hudson River by way of a canal, which was started but abandoned.

See also
Adirondack Canoe Classic
Northern Forest Canoe Trail

References

Sources
Jamieson, Paul and Morris, Donald, Adirondack Canoe Waters, North Flow, Lake George, NY: Adirondack Mountain Club, 1987.  .

External links
 Lakelubbers.com

Adirondacks
Lakes of New York (state)
Lakes of Hamilton County, New York
Tourist attractions in Hamilton County, New York
Northern Forest Canoe Trail